Moscow City Duma District 24 is one of 45 constituencies in Moscow City Duma. The constituency has covered parts of South-Eastern Moscow since 2014. From 1993-2005 District 24 was based in Southern Moscow; however, after the number of constituencies was reduced to 15 in 2005, the constituency was eliminated.

Members elected

Election results

2001

|-
! colspan=2 style="background-color:#E9E9E9;text-align:left;vertical-align:top;" |Candidate
! style="background-color:#E9E9E9;text-align:left;vertical-align:top;" |Party
! style="background-color:#E9E9E9;text-align:right;" |Votes
! style="background-color:#E9E9E9;text-align:right;" |%
|-
|style="background-color:"|
|align=left|Oleg Bocharov (incumbent)
|align=left|Independent
|
|80.24%
|-
|style="background-color:"|
|align=left|Aleksandr Strizhanov
|align=left|Independent
|
|8.49%
|-
|style="background-color:#000000"|
|colspan=2 |against all
|
|9.45%
|-
| colspan="5" style="background-color:#E9E9E9;"|
|- style="font-weight:bold"
| colspan="3" style="text-align:left;" | Total
| 
| 100%
|-
| colspan="5" style="background-color:#E9E9E9;"|
|- style="font-weight:bold"
| colspan="4" |Source:
|
|}

2014

|-
! colspan=2 style="background-color:#E9E9E9;text-align:left;vertical-align:top;" |Candidate
! style="background-color:#E9E9E9;text-align:left;vertical-align:top;" |Party
! style="background-color:#E9E9E9;text-align:right;" |Votes
! style="background-color:#E9E9E9;text-align:right;" |%
|-
|style="background-color:"|
|align=left|Zoya Zotova
|align=left|United Russia
|
|40.42%
|-
|style="background-color:"|
|align=left|Pavel Tarasov
|align=left|Communist Party
|
|26.18%
|-
|style="background-color:"|
|align=left|Vladimir Zotov
|align=left|A Just Russia
|
|13.11%
|-
|style="background-color:"|
|align=left|Tatyana Ovcharenko
|align=left|Yabloko
|
|8.72%
|-
|style="background-color:"|
|align=left|Roman Protasov
|align=left|Liberal Democratic Party
|
|4.87%
|-
|style="background-color:"|
|align=left|Sergey Kim
|align=left|Independent
|
|3.22%
|-
| colspan="5" style="background-color:#E9E9E9;"|
|- style="font-weight:bold"
| colspan="3" style="text-align:left;" | Total
| 
| 100%
|-
| colspan="5" style="background-color:#E9E9E9;"|
|- style="font-weight:bold"
| colspan="4" |Source:
|
|}

2019

|-
! colspan=2 style="background-color:#E9E9E9;text-align:left;vertical-align:top;" |Candidate
! style="background-color:#E9E9E9;text-align:left;vertical-align:top;" |Party
! style="background-color:#E9E9E9;text-align:right;" |Votes
! style="background-color:#E9E9E9;text-align:right;" |%
|-
|style="background-color:"|
|align=left|Pavel Tarasov
|align=left|Communist Party
|
|38.99%
|-
|style="background-color:"|
|align=left|Igor Dyagilev
|align=left|Independent
|
|33.08%
|-
|style="background-color:"|
|align=left|Nikolay Sheremetyev
|align=left|Liberal Democratic Party
|
|7.76%
|-
|style="background-color:"|
|align=left|Anton Tarasov
|align=left|Independent
|
|7.43%
|-
|style="background-color:"|
|align=left|Yekaterina Abramenko
|align=left|A Just Russia
|
|6.41%
|-
|style="background-color:"|
|align=left|Aleksey Balabutkin
|align=left|Communists of Russia
|
|2.74%
|-
| colspan="5" style="background-color:#E9E9E9;"|
|- style="font-weight:bold"
| colspan="3" style="text-align:left;" | Total
| 
| 100%
|-
| colspan="5" style="background-color:#E9E9E9;"|
|- style="font-weight:bold"
| colspan="4" |Source:
|
|}

References

Moscow City Duma districts